Stadio Domenico Francioni, is a multi-purpose stadium in Latina, Lazio, Italy. It is mainly used mostly for football matches and hosts the home matches of U.S. Latina Calcio of the Serie C. The stadium has a capacity of 9,398 spectators.

Football venues in Italy
Multi-purpose stadiums in Italy
Latina, Lazio